Jorge Silveira Zabala (6 January 1930, Tacuarembó – 7 July 2005) was a Uruguayan politician.

1930 births
2005 deaths
People from Tacuarembó
National Party (Uruguay) politicians